Las Flores (Spanish for "The Flowers") is a census-designated place (CDP) in Tehama County, California. The 2010 United States census reported Las Flores's population was 187.

History
Las Flores had its start in 1916 as a railroad community.

Geography
According to the United States Census Bureau, the CDP covers an area of 0.4 square miles (0.9 km2), all of it land.

Demographics
The 2010 United States Census reported that Las Flores had a population of 187. The racial makeup of Las Flores was 127 (67.9%) White, 0 (0.0%) African American, 5 (2.7%) Native American, 0 (0.0%) Asian, 0 (0.0%) Pacific Islander, 41 (21.9%) from other races, and 14 (7.5%) from two or more races. Hispanic or Latino of any race were 72 persons (38.5%).

The Census reported that 187 people (100% of the population) lived in households, 0 (0%) lived in non-institutionalized group quarters, and 0 (0%) were institutionalized.

There were 64 households, out of which 29 (45.3%) had children under the age of 18 living in them, 37 (57.8%) were opposite-sex married couples living together, 7 (10.9%) had a female householder with no husband present, 2 (3.1%) had a male householder with no wife present.  There were 3 (4.7%) unmarried opposite-sex partnerships, and 0 (0%) same-sex married couples or partnerships. 16 households (25.0%) were made up of individuals, and 10 (15.6%) had someone living alone who was 65 years of age or older. The average household size was 2.92.  There were 46 families (71.9% of all households); the average family size was 3.59.

The population was spread out, with 58 people (31.0%) under the age of 18, 8 people (4.3%) aged 18 to 24, 47 people (25.1%) aged 25 to 44, 50 people (26.7%) aged 45 to 64, and 24 people (12.8%) who were 65 years of age or older.  The median age was 33.9 years. For every 100 females, there were 120.0 males.  For every 100 females age 18 and over, there were 89.7 males.

The homeowner vacancy rate was 4.0%; the rental vacancy rate was 5.9%.  134 people (71.7% of the population) lived in owner-occupied housing units and 53 people (28.3%) lived in rental housing units.

References

Census-designated places in Tehama County, California
Census-designated places in California